One Week of Love is a 1922 American silent drama film directed by George Archainbaud and starring Elaine Hammerstein, Conway Tearle and Kate Lester.

Cast
 Elaine Hammerstein as Beth Wynn
 Conway Tearle as Buck Fearnley
 Kate Lester as Honoria Van Dyke
 Hallam Cooley as Francis Fraser
 Billie Dove as Bathing Party Guest

References

Bibliography
 Munden, Kenneth White. The American Film Institute Catalog of Motion Pictures Produced in the United States, Part 1. University of California Press, 1997.

External links
 

1922 films
1922 drama films
1920s English-language films
American silent feature films
Silent American drama films
American black-and-white films
Films directed by George Archainbaud
Selznick Pictures films
1920s American films